Stark County Courthouse is a historic courthouse in Dickinson, North Dakota, United States, which was built in 1936–1937. It was added to the National Register of Historic Places on November 25, 1985.

It was built for $213,000, which then represented quite a building boom, giving encouragement "to the local population that the hardest part of the Depression had ended."

It, along with the Hettinger County Courthouse (in Mott) is significant for its Art Deco architecture.  The Stark County Courthouse was designed by William F. Kurke, a prolific architect.

References

Art Deco architecture in North Dakota
Courthouses on the National Register of Historic Places in North Dakota
County courthouses in North Dakota
Dickinson, North Dakota
Government buildings completed in 1937
National Register of Historic Places in Stark County, North Dakota
1937 establishments in North Dakota